Ahmadiago is a fungal genus in the family Ustilaginaceae. It was circumscribed in 2004 to contain the smut fungus formerly known as Ustilago euphorbiae, found in India. The generic name honours Pakistani botanist and mycologist Sultan Ahmad.

References

External links 
 

Fungi of Asia
Monotypic Basidiomycota genera
Fungal plant pathogens and diseases
Ustilaginomycotina